The 1991 Trofeo Ilva-Coppa Mantegazza was a women's tennis tournament played on outdoor clay courts at the Circulo Tennis Ilva Taranto in Taranto, Italy that was part of the WTA Tier V category of the 1991 WTA Tour. It was the fifth edition of the tournament and was held from 30 April until 5 May 1991. Unseeded Emanuela Zardo won the singles title and earned $18,000 first-prize money.

Finals

Singles

 Emanuela Zardo defeated  Petra Ritter 7–5, 6–2
 It was Zardo's only singles title of her career.

Doubles

 Alexia Dechaume /  Florencia Labat defeated  Laura Golarsa /  Ann Grossman 6–2, 7–5

References

External links
 ITF tournament edition details
 Tournament draws

Mantegazza Cup
Ilva Trophy
1991 in Italian tennis
1991 in Italian women's sport